Michaëlla Krajicek was the defending champion, but lost in the First Round to Séverine Brémond.

Anna Chakvetadze won in the Final against Vasilisa Bardina,6–3, 7–6(7–3).

Seeds

  Anna Chakvetadze (champion)
  Anabel Medina Garrigues (second round)
  Flavia Pennetta (first round)
  Maria Kirilenko (first round)
  Mara Santangelo (second round)
  Alona Bondarenko (second round)
  Zheng Jie (quarterfinals)
  Martina Müller (first round)

Draw

Finals

Top half

Bottom half

Qualifying

Seeds

Qualifiers

Draw

First qualifier

Second qualifier

Third qualifier

Fourth qualifier

External links
 ITF tournament edition details

Hobart International – Singles
Sin